Murtaza Khan may refer to:

 Ghulam Murtaza Khan, 19th-century painter from Delhi
 Ghulam Murtaza Khan Jatoi, Pakistani politician
 Murtaza Ahmed Khan, politician from Jammu and Kashmir
 Murtaza Ali Khan, 20th-century Nawab of Rampur
 Murtaza Ali Khan (film critic), Indian film critic and journalist
 Shaikh Farid Bukhari, 17th-century Mughal noble bearing the title Murtaza Khan